The Military Ordinariate of Korea  is a military ordinariate of the Catholic Church. Immediately subject to the Holy See, it provides pastoral care to Catholics serving in the Republic of Korea (South Korea) Armed Forces and their families.

History
It was established as a military vicariate on 22 November 1983 and elevated to a military ordinariate on 21 July 1986.

Office holders

Military vicars
 Angelo Kim Nam-su (1983–1986)

Military ordinaries
 Angelo Kim Nam-su (1986–1989)
 Augustine Cheong Myong-jo (1989–1998), appointed Coadjutor Bishop of Pusan
 Peter Lee Ki-heon (1999–2010), appointed Coadjutor Bishop of Uijeongbu
 Francis Xavier Yu Soo-il, O.F.M. (2010–2021)
 Titus Seo Sang-bum (2021–present)

References

External links 
 Military Ordinariate of Korea (Catholic-Hierarchy)
 Military Ordinariate of South Korea (GCatholic.org)

South Korea
South Korea
Ord